Terrence Rønnestad Oglesby (born March 12, 1988) is an American-Norwegian professional basketball player who last played for the Umeå BBK of the Swedish Basketligan. Before moving to Europe to play professionally, he had played college basketball for Clemson University. Born in Kongsberg, Norway, Oglesby holds dual citizenship with the United States and Norway.

High school career 
Oglesby played basketball at the Bradley Central High School in his hometown of Cleveland, Tennessee. He was selected to the All-Region team three times and received Most Valuable Player honors twice. He was selected to the Tennessee Sports Writers Association (TSWA) All-State boys basketball team as a junior and senior. Oglesby is the all-time leading scorer at Bradley Central with 2,256 career points. He was a finalist for the 2007 Tennessee Secondary School Athletic Association (TSSAA) Mr. Basketball Award at the class AAA level. Oglesby was the 26th-ranked shooting guard on Rivals.com's rankings for the high school class of 2007. He signed with Clemson along with Demontez Stitt and Jerai Grant, the latter of whom Oglesby played against in the Capital Classic All-Star Game.

Collegiate career 
As a freshman—in the 2007–08 season—Oglesby played 18.2 minutes per game and averaged 10.5 points per game; he was the team leader in three-point field goals made (85) and three-point field-goal accuracy (40.5%). He was a two-time Atlantic Coast Conference (ACC) Rookie-of-the-Week selection, the most selections received by a Clemson player since Cliff Hammonds was selected four times in the 2004–05 season. Oglesby was also named as Honorable Mention to the ACC All-Freshman Team. In his sophomore season (2008–09), Oglesby played in every game. He averaged 13.7 points per game and led the team in three-point field goals made and free throw percentage. On December 30, 2008, Oglesby scored a career-high 25 points, making 6 of 10 three-pointers, in a 98–87 Clemson victory over South Carolina. In what turned out to be his final college basketball game, against the Michigan Wolverines in the first round of the NCAA tournament, Oglesby was ejected early in the second half for intentionally throwing an elbow against an opposing player.

Professional career 
On May 26, 2009, Oglesby announced that he had decided to forgo his final two seasons at Clemson and play professional basketball in Europe. Fifteen teams from Italy and Spain had been interested in signing Oglesby, who had not yet signed with an agent at the time of his departure from Clemson. Ultimately, he signed with NSB Napoli in the Italian Serie A. He later left Napoli before appearing in a game for them, going on to play in the Ukraine and Spain during the 2009–10 season. He continued on in Spain and Sweden between 2010 and 2013, before moving to France and playing for Saint-Brieuc during the 2013–14 season.

In January 2015, Oglesby signed with Rustavi of the Georgian Superliga.

On October 31, 2015, Oglesby was acquired by the Iowa Energy of the NBA Development League following a successful tryout with the team. On January 26, he was waived by Iowa.

International career 
In 2008, Oglesby played for Norway at the FIBA Europe Under-20 Championship and was the leading scorer of the team's Division B with an average of 24.4 points per game. Norway finished in 11th place.

References

External links
 Clemson Tigers bio
 RealGM profile
 Sports-Reference profile

1988 births
Living people
American expatriate basketball people in France
American expatriate basketball people in Georgia (country)
American expatriate basketball people in Spain
American expatriate basketball people in Sweden
American expatriate basketball people in Ukraine
American people of Norwegian descent
Basketball players from Tennessee
CB Tarragona players
Clemson Tigers men's basketball players
Iowa Energy players
MBC Mykolaiv players
Norwegian men's basketball players
People from Cleveland, Tennessee
People from Kongsberg
Shooting guards
BC Rustavi players
American men's basketball players
Sportspeople from Viken (county)